The 1902–03 Northern Rugby Football Union season was the eighth season of rugby league football.

Season summary

League Champions: Halifax

Challenge Cup Winners: Halifax (7-0 v Salford)

2nd Division Champions: Keighley

There was no county league competition this season.

Notable events
 Four of the top five clubs from the 1901–02 Lancashire Senior Competition; Hull Kingston Rovers (although based in Yorkshire, and having played in the Yorkshire Senior Competition for the 1899–1900 and 1900–01 seasons, they had played the 1901–02 season in the Lancashire Senior Competition), St. Helens, Widnes, and Wigan joined the 14-clubs from the previous season's 1901–02 Northern Rugby League to make an 18-club Division 1, the exception was Barrow who despite finishing fourth in the 1901–02 Lancashire Senior Competition joined Division 2.
 At the end of the season Manningham Rugby Club decided to switch to Association Football and became Bradford City A.F.C., whilst staying at Valley Parade.

Division 1

Division 2

Challenge Cup

Halifax beat Salford 7-0 in the final at Leeds before a crowd of 32,507

Sources
1902-03 Rugby Football League season at wigan.rlfans.com
The Challenge Cup at The Rugby Football League website

References

1902 in English rugby league
1903 in English rugby league
Northern Rugby Football Union seasons